The fifth season of the American television sitcom New Girl premiered on January 5, 2016, on Fox in its new timeslot of 8:00pm (Eastern). The show briefly aired back-to-back on April 19 before airing the final six episodes, beginning April 26, at 8:00 and 9:00 pm respectively.

Developed by Elizabeth Meriwether under the working title Chicks & Dicks, the series revolves around offbeat teacher Jess (Zooey Deschanel) after her moving into an LA loft with three men, Nick (Jake Johnson), Schmidt (Max Greenfield), and Winston (Lamorne Morris); Jess's best friend Cece (Hannah Simone) also appears regularly. The show combines comedy and drama elements as the characters, who are in their early thirties, deal with maturing relationships and career choices.

Production
On March 31, 2015, New Girl was renewed for a fifth season. The show remained in production after wrapping season four in order to get a jump on season 5 ahead of Deschanel's maternity leave. Deschanel was absent in 6 episodes of the fifth season. The onscreen reason for her absence was that her character was sequestered for jury duty.

John Cho was the first guest announced after New Girl was renewed for season 5. Fred Armisen, Stephen Rannazzisi and Ally Maki all signed up to guest star this season.

Megan Fox was cast in the role of Reagan and temporarily filled in for Zooey Deschanel after she pre-taped her episodes last spring before taking a maternity leave. This season did not premiere in the autumn of 2015, but instead on January 2016, with what Fox states to be "its first-ever season of virtually uninterrupted originals." Damon Wayans, Jr. made his return for a two episode arc this season.

Cast and characters

Main cast
 Zooey Deschanel as Jessica "Jess" Day
 Jake Johnson as Nick Miller
 Max Greenfield as Schmidt
 Lamorne Morris as Winston Bishop
 Hannah Simone as Cece

Special guest cast
 Megan Fox as Reagan
 Damon Wayans Jr. as Coach

Recurring cast
 Curtis Armstrong as Principal Foster
 Steve Agee as Outside Dave
 Meaghan Rath as May
 Peter Gallagher as Gavin
 David Walton as Sam
 Nasim Pedrad as Aly Nelson
 Nelson Franklin as Robby
 Fred Melamed as J. Cronkite Valley-Forge
 Rebecca Reid as Nadia

Guest cast
 John Cho as Daniel Grant
 Anna George as Priyanka
 Rob Riggle as Big Schmidt
 Taran Killam as Fred
 Julie Hagerty as Nancy
 Henry Winkler as Flip
 Sam Richardson as Dunston
 Fred Armisen as Brandon
Stephen Rannazzisi as Todd Ploons
Ally Maki as Kumiko
 Busy Philipps as Connie
 Sonequa Martin-Green as Rhonda
 apl.de.ap as himself
 Kiersey Clemons as KC
 Bill Burr as Bob
 Lennon Parham as Carol
 Ian Roberts as Billy
 Clea DuVall as Camilla
 Demetri Martin as Juror 237B/Gary
 Elizabeth Berkley Lauren as Becky Cavatappi
 Lucy Punch as Genevieve
 Gillian Vigman as Kim
 Kal Penn as Tripp
 Nora Dunn as Louise
 Kim Wayans as Susan
 Caitlin FitzGerald as Diane

Episodes

References

External links

 
 

New Girl
2016 American television seasons